Gephyromantis corvus, commonly known as the Isalo Madagascar frog, is a species of frog in the family Mantellidae.  It is endemic to Madagascar.  Its natural habitats are subtropical or tropical dry forests and rivers.  It is threatened by habitat loss.

References

corvus
Endemic fauna of Madagascar
Taxonomy articles created by Polbot
Amphibians described in 1994